Jason William Gore (born May 17, 1974) is an American professional golfer.

Amateur career
Gore was born in Van Nuys, California. He grew up playing junior golf with Tiger Woods.

Gore attended the University of Arizona, then transferred to Pepperdine University. At Pepperdine, he was part of their NCAA Division I Championship team in 1997. He also played on the victorious Walker Cup team that year.

Professional career
Gore turned professional in 1997. In 2005, he played on the PGA Tour after moving from the Nationwide Tour mid-season, after receiving a battlefield promotion, which is given when a player wins three Nationwide Tour events in one season. 

Gore has one PGA Tour win, the 84 Lumber Classic in 2005, and is the all-time leader in career wins on what is now the Korn Ferry Tour, with seven. Gore belongs to a small group of players who have shot 59 in their careers. His historic round of 59 happened on Friday of the 2005 Cox Classic at Champions Run in Omaha, Nebraska. He is also one of two golfers to win on both the Korn Ferry Tour and PGA Tour in the same season, following Paul Stankowski in 1996.

Gore played in the final group of the 2005 U.S. Open with Retief Goosen. He shot a 14-over-par 84 to drop all the way to a tie for 49th; Michael Campbell won the event. Gore was not fully exempt on the PGA Tour from 2009 to 2014.  Gore had a strong 2015, but a poor 2016 saw him finish outside 150th, limiting him to past champion status for 2017.

During the third round of the 2016 Farmers Insurance Open at Torrey Pines, Gore made a double eagle on the par-5 18th hole.

After injuries and poor play, Gore went into the insurance business. In 2018, he received his license and is one of the co-founders of Kirkman Gore Insurance Services.

As a comeback from his retirement, Gore earned a sponsor exemption for the 2018 RSM Classic on the PGA Tour. After three rounds, he was in second place, a stroke behind leader Charles Howell III after posting scores of 68, 63 and 67. In the final round, Gore shot +2 and finished T15 for the tournament. In March 2019, Gore was named the first player relations director for the USGA.

Personal life
Gore resides in Gladstone, New Jersey with his wife, Megan, his son, Jaxon, and his daughter, Olivia.

Amateur wins 
this list may be incomplete
1996 Sahalee Players Championship
1997 Pacific Coast Amateur, California State Amateur

Professional wins (12)

PGA Tour wins (1)

Nationwide Tour wins (7)

Nationwide Tour playoff record (1–0)

Other wins (4)
1997 (1) California State Open (as an amateur)
2004 (1) California State Open
2008 (1) Straight Down Fall Classic (with Kevin Marsh)
2013 (1) Straight Down Fall Classic (with Kevin Marsh)

Results in major championships

CUT = missed the half-way cut
"T" = tied

Results in The Players Championship

CUT = missed the halfway cut
WD = withdrew
"T" indicates a tie for a place

Results in World Golf Championships

"T" = Tied

U.S. national team appearances
Amateur
Walker Cup: 1997 (winners)

See also
2000 PGA Tour Qualifying School graduates
2002 Buy.com Tour graduates
2005 Nationwide Tour graduates
2014 Web.com Tour Finals graduates
List of golfers with most Web.com Tour wins
Lowest rounds of golf

References

External links

American male golfers
Arizona Wildcats men's golfers
Pepperdine Waves men's golfers
PGA Tour golfers
Korn Ferry Tour graduates
Golfers from California
People from Van Nuys, Los Angeles
Sportspeople from Los Angeles County, California
People from Valencia, Santa Clarita, California
People from Peapack-Gladstone, New Jersey
1974 births
Living people